Dudley Do-Right is a 1999 American slapstick comedy film written and directed by Hugh Wilson, based on Jay Ward's Dudley Do-Right, produced by Davis Entertainment for Universal Studios. The film stars Brendan Fraser as the cartoon's titular Mountie with supporting roles from Sarah Jessica Parker, Alfred Molina, and Eric Idle.

Plot
Three children are with a horse. These are young versions of Dudley Do-Right, Nell Fenwick, Snidely Whiplash, and Horse. The three talk of their aspirations; Dudley believes he is destined to be a Royal Canadian Mounted Police officer (Mountie), and Nell wishes to see the world, while Snidely wishes to be the "bad guy".

Several years later, all three have fulfilled their supposed destinies. Dudley is now a Mountie (but always adheres to the rules and is frequently oblivious to even the most obvious of things), and Snidely has become an infamous bank robber. After Snidely and his gang rob a bank of its money and gold, Snidely tricks his entire gang into believing he has fled with all the gold to the Sudan and going on a wild goose chase after him. Snidely subsequently salts local lakes with the stolen gold. Dudley catches him in the act, but Snidely fools him into thinking he is vampire hunting, and uses a similar tactic to scare Horse off. Not long after, Nell returns from her world tour and reunites with Dudley, and the two spend the night attending a festival at the nearby Kumquat tribe.

Meanwhile, Prospector Kim J. Darling, the poorest man in Semi-Happy Valley, stumbles across the gold in the river and is made into a media sensation by Snidely. The subsequent gold rush boosts Snidely's popularity and, after foreclosing many local mortgages, he quickly takes control of the town, renaming it "Whiplash City". Eventually, Snidely's men return from the Sudan to kill him for his deceit, but Snidely convinces them otherwise by offering them lives of luxury in his new town. Dudley becomes convinced that Snidely is up to something and confronts him, but Snidely laughs him off and snatches Nell from him. Snidely sends his second-in-command, Homer, to assassinate Dudley with a bomb, but Dudley is absent when the bomb goes off. Nell's father Inspector Fenwick, who is in good favor with Snidely, discovers Dudley's feud with Snidely and discharges Dudley from the Mounties. Dudley falls into a depression and wanders across the town until he runs into a drunken Kim, who offers him shelter at his cave in the woods. Darling tells Dudley of Snidely's plans and newfound popularity and takes him to see a Gala Ball in Snidely's honor. Despite Kim's warning not to challenge Snidely due to his loss of favor, Dudley comically attempts to take Nell back from Snidely, but loses pathetically.

Feeling sympathy for Dudley, Kim decides to put him through a very harsh training regimen to make him a more formidable opponent and take back Semi-Valley from Snidely. Dudley's first act is to intimidate one of Snidely's men into telling him the next gold shipment. Disguised as a motorbike-driving vigilante, Dudley sabotages the shipment and leaves his mark on Snidely's workshop as well as his favorite golf course. Snidely, unaware that Dudley lost his job, is offended by this and more so with his men's incompetence to stop him, believing Dudley is enjoying the perks of being the villain. Eventually, Kim leaves to find his family and parts ways with Dudley, thanking him for his friendship. Dudley then uses his new training to win Nell back from Snidely, who swears revenge. At a nighttime town meeting, Snidely attempts to rally the people against Dudley, but it falls on deaf ears. The populace have grown weary of Snidely and shows more respect for Dudley in his efforts to retake their town.

Snidely ultimately discovers that Dudley and Nell are at another festival with the Kumquat tribe and leads a full-scale attack on them. The Kumquats flee for their lives until Horse reappears and helps Dudley sabotage Snidely's tanks by making Snidely and Homer accidentally shoot each other. A cavalry of Mounties appears and arrests Snidely and his men. Kim also arrives with his wife, the Prime Minister of Canada (Jessica Schreier), and is reunited with Dudley, revealing that they called out the cavalry. Inspector Fenwick reinstates Dudley in the Mounties. The final scene shows Dudley and Nell living together in Dudley's rebuilt house, sharing a kiss.

Cast

Brendan Fraser as Dudley Do-Right, the somewhat dim member of the Royal Canadian Mounted Police
Dyllan Christopher as Young Dudley
Sarah Jessica Parker as Nell Fenwick, Dudley's love interest and Inspector Fenwick's daughter
Ashley Yarman as young Nell
Alfred Molina as Snidely Whiplash, Dudley's arch-rival
Jeremy Bergman as Young Snidely
Eric Idle as Kim J. Darling 
Robert Prosky as Inspector Fenwick
Alex Rocco as Kumquat Chief
Jack Kehler as Homer, Snidely's feeble minded second in command
Jed Rees as Lavar, one of Snidely's henchmen
C. Ernst Harth as Shane, one of Snidely's henchmen
Regis Philbin as himself
Kathie Lee Gifford as herself
Michael Chambers as dancer
Anne Fletcher as dancer
Don Yesso as Kenneth
Jessica Schreier as Mrs. Darling
Louis Mustillo as standing room only
Kevin Blatch as Townsperson
Ernie Grunwald as Customs Officer
Gerard Plunkett as Spin Worthy
Michal Suchánek as Ten-year-old Boy
Brent Butt as a bad guy in back
David Fredericks as yet another bad guy
Kevin Mundy as Mr. Darling
Adrian Armas as dancer
Scott Fowler as dancer
Amber Funk as dancer
Lisa Ratzin as dancer
Artine Tony Browne as bad guy
Robin Mossley as in the way back
Gerald Scarr as death row guard

Production
Hugh Wilson was signed to write and direct the film in July 1997 for a fee of $5 million.

The film was shot on-site in Vancouver, British Columbia and Santa Clarita, California.

Dudley Do-Right was Fraser's second film based on a Jay Ward cartoon, 1997's George of the Jungle being the first. Despite the different studios producing each film (George of the Jungle was adapted by Disney), advertising for the Dudley Do-Right film made open reference to this coincidence: "From the creator of George of the Jungle…and the star of George of the Jungle…and the acclaimed director who saw George of the Jungle…"

Reception

Box office
The film was a box office bomb. In its opening weekend, it grossed $3,018,345 - ranking eleventh for the weekend - and went on to gross just $9,974,410 domestically against a budget of $22 million.

Critical response
The film received unfavorable reviews. On Rotten Tomatoes, it has an approval rating of 16% based on reviews from 45 critics. The site's consensus states: "Gags aren't that funny". On Metacritic the film has a weighted average score of 44% based on reviews from 23 critics, indicating "mixed or average reviews". Audiences surveyed by CinemaScore gave the film a grade "C+" on scale of A to F.

Kenneth Turan of the Los Angeles Times, said that it "disappoints in every way possible, forcing its failed tongue-in-cheek humor and proving one more time that not all successful cartoons cry out for live-action treatment". The film did get a positive review from The New York Times''' Janet Maslin, who  said that the film "attempts to be both zany entertainment for children and nostalgic fun for those who grew up on this and other deft, snarky Ward creations. (Rocky, Bullwinkle and George of the Jungle are other well-loved Ward characters.) And it works pretty well, too. Beyond the sure-fire goofy presence of Brendan Fraser and the comic possibilities of a Canadian mountie who rides his horse backward, this jokey romp written and directed by Hugh Wilson has an appealing try-anything spirit. It's a movie that can start with Mr. Fraser buttoned into his stiff red uniform and have him dancing shirtless in a Las Vegas-style Indian act before its story is over".Chicago Sun-Times critic Roger Ebert gave the film a two and a half stars out of four, writing: "Dudley Do-Right is a genial live-action version of the old cartoon, with a lot of broad slapstick humor that kids like and adults wince at. I did a little wincing the ninth or tenth time Dudley stepped on a loose plank and it slammed him in the head, but I enjoyed the film more than I expected to. It's harmless, simple-minded, and has a couple of sequences better than Dudley really deserves".

Home mediaDudley Do-Right'' was released on VHS and DVD on December 28, 1999, and on Blu-ray on October 8, 2019.

Notes

References

External links

1999 comedy films
1990s police comedy films
American comedy films
Davis Entertainment films
Films based on television series
Films directed by Hugh Wilson
Films produced by John Davis
Films scored by Steve Dorff
Films shot in California
Films shot in Vancouver
Films with screenplays by Hugh Wilson
Live-action films based on animated series
Live-action films based on Jay Ward cartoons
Northern (genre) films
Royal Canadian Mounted Police in fiction
The Adventures of Rocky and Bullwinkle and Friends
Universal Pictures films
1990s English-language films
1990s American films